Albury End is a hamlet in Hertfordshire, England. It is in the civil parish of Albury.

External links

Hamlets in Hertfordshire
East Hertfordshire District